Christoph Bieler (born 28 October 1977 in Hall in Tirol) is an Austrian former Nordic combined athlete. Competing in four Winter Olympics, he won two medals in the 4 x 5 km team event with a gold in 2006 and a bronze medal in 2002. Bieler's best individual Winter Olympic finish was tenth in the 10 km individual large hill event at Vancouver in 2010.

He also won two 4 x 5 km team medals at the FIS Nordic World Ski Championships with gold in 2003 and bronze in 2005, and had his best individual finish of sixth twice (10 km mass start: 2009, 15 km individual: 2003).

Bieler has four individual victories since 2006.

External links

 

Austrian male Nordic combined skiers
1977 births
Living people
Nordic combined Grand Prix winners
Nordic combined skiers at the 1998 Winter Olympics
Nordic combined skiers at the 2002 Winter Olympics
Nordic combined skiers at the 2006 Winter Olympics
Nordic combined skiers at the 2010 Winter Olympics
Nordic combined skiers at the 2014 Winter Olympics
Olympic gold medalists for Austria
Olympic bronze medalists for Austria
Olympic Nordic combined skiers of Austria
Olympic medalists in Nordic combined
FIS Nordic World Ski Championships medalists in Nordic combined
People from Hall in Tirol
Medalists at the 2006 Winter Olympics
Medalists at the 2002 Winter Olympics
Medalists at the 2014 Winter Olympics
Sportspeople from Tyrol (state)